Rebecca Ballantine Reid is a British actress and former model, based in Los Angeles.

Career
She has worked as a model in Tokyo, Paris, and London, featuring in magazines such as Harpers Bazaar, i-D, and Elle.

In 2014, Rebecca featured in Herbal Essences “Be Everyone You Are” campaign.

Reid's first major role came as Nadia in the first season of Fox's sitcom New Girl, in which she was a recurring character.

She has also featured in the Emmy-nominated comedy series Childrens Hospital on Adult Swim , and stars in Comedy Central's UK sitcom I Live with Models.

She also performs stand-up, most regularly at Hollywood's Comedy Store and Hollywood Improv.

Reid was named as one of Screen International's Stars of Tomorrow in 2013.

Filmography

Television

References

External links

Living people
Place of birth missing (living people)
British female models
British television actresses
British film actresses
Year of birth missing (living people)